Sir Payn Tiptoft (c. 1351 – c. 1413), of Burwell, Cambridgeshire, was an English politician.

He was a Member (MP) of the Parliament of England for Cambridgeshire in 1399 and January 1404.

References

1351 births
1413 deaths
English MPs 1399
English MPs January 1404
People from Burwell, Cambridgeshire
Younger sons of barons